In public transport, Route 18 may refer to:

Route 18 (Baltimore streetcar), a former streetcar in Baltimore, Maryland
London Buses route 18

18